Araeophylla natrixella is a species of moth in the family Gelechiidae. It was described by Weber in 1945. It is found in Switzerland.

References

Araeophylla
Moths described in 1945
Moths of Europe